The 12th Alpini Regiment is an inactive regiment of the Italian Army's mountain infantry speciality, the Alpini, which distinguished itself in combat during World War I and World War II. First formed on 15 February 1936 to command the units of the 7th Alpini Regiment, which remained in Italy and did not participate in the Second Italo-Ethiopian War, the regiment was disbanded on 1 July 1937 upon the 7th Alpini Regiment's return to Italy. Formed again on 8 August 1992 as unit of the Alpine Brigade "Cadore", the regiment was inactivated 31 January 1997.

History 
The regiment was reformed on 8 August 1992 by elevating the existing Alpini Battalion "Pieve di Cadore" to regiment. Between 1 August 1887 and 11 November 1975 the battalion was part of the 7th Alpini Regiment. After the 7th Alpini Regiment was disbanded during the 1975 Italian Army reform the Pieve di Cadore, based in Tai di Cadore, became one of the battalions of the Alpine Brigade "Cadore". As the traditions and flag of the 7th Alpini Regiment were assigned to the "Feltre" battalion, the Pieve di Cadore was granted a new war flag on 12 November 1976 by decree 846 of the President of the Italian Republic Giovanni Leone. The Silver Medal of Military Valour awarded to the 7th Alpini Regiment for the regiment's service in the Greco-Italian war, the Gold Medal of Civil Valour awarded to the 7th Alpini Regiment for its service after the Vajont disaster and the Messina earthquake Medal of Merit awarded to the 7th Alpini Regiment in 1908, were duplicated for the new flag of the Pieve di Cadore.

With the downsizing of the Italian Army after the end of the Cold War the 12th Alpini Regiment and its battalion were disbanded on 31 January 1997.

Structure 
When the regiment was disbanded it had the following structure:

  Regimental Command
  Command and Logistic Support Company
  Alpini Battalion "Pieve di Cadore"
  67th Alpini Company
  68th Alpini Company
  75th Alpini Company
  167th Mortar Company

External links
 12th Alpini Regiment on vecio.it

Sources 
 Franco dell'Uomo, Rodolfo Puletti: L'Esercito Italiano verso il 2000 - Volume Primo - Tomo I, Rome 1998, Stato Maggiore dell'Esercito - Ufficio Storico, page: 501

References 

Alpini regiments of Italy
Military units and formations established in 1936
Military units and formations established in 1937
Military units and formations established in 1992
Military units and formations established in 1997